"So What" is the first single from Field Mob's third album, Light Poles and Pine Trees, featuring multi-platinum recording artist Ciara, who performs the chorus and the bridge. The single peaked at #10 on the Billboard Hot 100 chart making it Field Mob's first Top 10 single and Ciara's sixth.

The first two lines from the first verse (I'm a slut, I'm a hoe, I'm a freak, I got a different girl everyday of the week) are taken from the chorus rapped by The Notorious B.I.G. from Lil' Kim's 1997 single "Crush on You."

Music video
At the beginning of the music video Jazze Pha is standing in front of a car giving the introduction. The shot then switches over to Ciara who is reclining on a banister of a house, and sings the chorus. Smoke's girlfriend confront him about all of the horrible things she's heard about him. Smoke tries convince her that it's all a lie in his rap, but eventually she went back to her friends.

The shot changes to Ciara, who is shopping for clothes at a mini mall and see two "haters" gossiping about Shawn Jay. Shawn Jay's girlfriend is in a dressing room and overhears all of this nonsense. Soon as the chorus stats playing towards the end she quickly pulls the curtains away and stares at the two "haters". She then confronts Shawn Jay about what the two "haters" were talking about. He denies it all through his rap, but she eventually left the store.

Then there comes a shot with Ciara singing the chorus in an urban neighborhood setting. Jazze Pha then comes in to introduce Ciara's part in the bridge. She sings and dances to it, and while doing that both Smoke and Shawn Jay's girlfriends come to the basketball game in which they are watching. They make up, and hug each other, and Smoke and Shawn Jay had gotten them both a gift: a puppy and a necklace. The song then fades out and we see a shot of Smoke and Shawn Jay dancing in the same urban neighborhood setting that Ciara was singing in at the beginning of the video.

Charts

Weekly charts

Year-end charts

References

2006 singles
Ciara songs
Field Mob songs
Song recordings produced by Jazze Pha
2006 songs